The New England Rugby Football Union (NERFU) is a Geographical Union (GU) for rugby union teams in New England.

Prior to 2013, NERFU had been a local area union ("LAU"), and part of the Northeast Rugby Union (NRU), which is the governing body for three LAU's (New York State Rugby Football Conference (NYSRFC) and Metropolitan New York Rugby Union being the others).

There are currently over 80 active teams and over 3,000 registered players in the New England area.

Mission

The mission of the New England Rugby Football Union is to manage, serve, and promote the game of rugby in the New England area, at all levels of play; to assist member teams and participants in their various forms of involvement with the game; to adhere to all the laws of the game; and to encourage and facilitate the involvement of as many people as possible in rugby activities.  NERFU focuses the majority of its attention on serving rugby at the club level, and less on the collegiate and HS levels.

Divisions

Men's

Club

Division I

Mystic River Rugby Club

Division II

New London, Coast Guard Academy RFC 
Newport RFC
Portland RFC
Worcester RFC
Boston Irish Wolfhounds
South Shore Anchors
Hartford Wanderers RFC
Boston RFC
Mystic Barbarians

Division III

New London County RFC
MIT RFC
Boston Irish Wolfhounds 2nd XV
Amoskeag Rugby
Boston Maccabi Rugby, Newton, MA
North Shore Rugby Football Club
Old Gold Rugby Football Club
Charles River Rats RFC
Albany RFC
Providence RFC

Division IV

 Monadnock Rugby (New Hampshire)
 Springfield RFC (Massachusetts)
 Freedom RFC (New Hampshire)
 Mad River/Stowe RFC (Vermont)
 Burlington RFC (Vermont)
 Upper Valley RFC (New Hampshire)
 Boston Ironsides RFC (Massachusetts)
 Cape Cod RFC (Massachusetts)
 Black River RFC (Vermont)
 South Shore 2nd XV (Massachusetts)

Collegiate

Division I
NERFU's Division I program lost multiple rugby programs when the ivy league colleges left to form the Ivy League Rugby Conference (Harvard, Yale, Dartmouth).
Boston College (see BCRFC)
Northeastern University (see NURFC)
University of Connecticut
University of Massachusetts Amherst (See UMRFC)
University of Albany
Southern Connecticut State University
Middlebury College

Division II
Boston University
University of Vermont
College of the Holy Cross
University of New Hampshire
University of Maine, Orono
Norwich University
University of Rhode Island

Division III

Maine Conference
Colby College
Bowdoin College
University of Maine at Farmington
Bates College
Maine Maritime Academy
University of Maine at Orono

Boston Conference
Tufts University
Worcester Polytechnic Institute
Babson College
Wentworth Institute of Technology

Central Conference
Salve Regina University
Bryant University
Roger Williams College
Wheaton College
Massachusetts Maritime Academy
University of Massachusetts Dartmouth
Johnson and Wales University

Western Conference
Williams College
Amherst College
Plymouth State College
Keene State College
Castleton University
Franklin Pierce University

Southern Conference
New Haven U23
Central Connecticut State University
Western Connecticut State University
Springfield College
University of Hartford
Trinity College
Western New England College
Eastern Connecticut State University
Brandeis University

Division IV

Central Conference
Westfield State University
Nichols College
Wesleyan University
Connecticut College
Southern Vermont College
Massachusetts College of Liberal Arts

South Conference
Lasell College
Framingham State College
Rhode Island College
University of New England
Mitchell College

North Conference
Colby-Sawyer College
Green Mountain College
Champlain College
Lyndon State College
Maine Maritime Academy
Johnson State College

U19
NERFU has essentially abdicated its role in overseeing U-19/HS Rugby in favor of state based rugby organizations (SRBOs).  In New England, there are nascent SRBOs in VT, CT and MA.

Division I
Amoskeag RFC U19 Squad
Bishop Hendricken High School
Belmont High School (MA)
Boston College High School
Lincoln-Sudbury High School
Scituate Stormers Rugby
St. John's Preparatory School
Middlesex RFC U19 Squad
Xaverian Brothers High School
Brookline High School

Division II
Cheshire Rams
Essex High School
Fairfield High School
Falmouth High School
Groton School
Kearsarge Regional High School
Kimball Union Academy
Mad River Valley Boys
Middlesex Youth RFC
Needham High School Men's Rugby Club
North Country RFC U19 Squad
North Quincy High School Rugby Football Club
Phillips Exeter Academy
Portland RFC U19 Squad
Rutland RFC U19 Squad
Springfield RFC
Stanstead College
Staples High School
Upper Valley Youth RFC
Winged Beavers
Malden Catholic High School
Arlington Catholic High School
Marshfield High School
Catholic Memorial High School

Massachusetts Youth Rugby Organization (MYRO)
The Massachusetts SBRO (http://myrugby.org) is now the umbrella organization for youth rugby in the state.  All High School, U19, and U15 clubs are now under their auspices.

Boston middle schools that play rugby include Washington Irving, Edwards, Orchard Gardens, and Lee Academy.

Women's

Club

Women's Premier League
Beantown RFC

Division I
Albany Knickerbocker Sirens RFC
Boston Women RFC
Providence WRFC

Division II
Burlington WRFC
Charles River WRFC
Hartford Wild Roses
Seacoast WRFC
Worcester WRFC
Portland, Maine (PWRFC)
North Shore, Massachusetts North Shore Monsoons WRFC

Division III

Connecticut Yankees WRFC

Vermont Law School WRFC

Collegiate

Division I

Eastern Conference
Boston College
Brown University
Boston University
Radcliffe College
Providence College
Northeastern University

Western Conference
Amherst College
Dartmouth College
University of Massachusetts Amherst
Williams College
University of Connecticut
Yale University

Division II

Downeast Conference
Bates College
Bowdoin College (Bowdoin College Men's Rugby)
Colby College
University of Maine at Farmington
University of Maine, Orono
University of New Hampshire

East Conference
Babson College
Wesleyan University
Smith College
Tufts University
University of Rhode Island
Wellesley College
Worcester Polytechnic Institute

West Conference
Castleton State College
Keene State College
Middlebury College
Norwich University
Plymouth State College
University of Vermont

Division III

East Conference
Bentley College
Brandeis University
Bridgewater State College
MIT
Stonehill College
Wheaton College

South Conference
US Coast Guard Academy
Central Connecticut State University
Rhode Island College
Trinity College
University of Hartford
Western Connecticut State University
Roger Williams University

West Conference
Colby-Sawyer College
Framingham State College
Johnson State College
Mount Holyoke College
Saint Michael's College
University of Massachusetts Lowell

Division IV

East Conference
College of the Holy Cross
Saint Anselm College
University of Massachusetts Dartmouth
Wentworth Institute of Technology

West Conference
Connecticut College
Green Mountain College
Lyndon State College
Nichols College
Southern Vermont College
Springfield College
Western New England College

U19

Division I
Colchester High School
Essex High School
Marshfield High School
Newport High School
Needham High School Women's Rugby Club
Phillips Exeter Academy
Portland RFC U19 Girls
Rutland RFC U19 Girls
South Burlington High School
Sugar River Girls
Upper Valley Youth
Newton South High School Girls Rugby Club

Championships
1997
Men's Club D1 - 
Men's Club D2 -
Men's Club D3 -
Women's Club D1 -
Women's Club D2 -
Women's Club D3 -
Men's College D1 -
Men's College D2 - 
Men's College D3 - University of Massachusetts Lowell
Women's College D1 - 
Women's College D2 - 
Women's College D3 -

1998
Men's Club D1 - 
Men's Club D2 -
Men's Club D3 -
Women's Club D1 -
Women's Club D2 -
Women's Club D3 -
Men's College D1 -
Men's College D2 - 
Men's College D3 - University of Massachusetts Lowell 
Women's College D1 - 
Women's College D2 - 
Women's College D3 -

1999
Men's Club D1 - 
Men's Club D2 -
Men's Club D3 -
Women's Club D1 -
Women's Club D2 -
Women's Club D3 -
Men's College D1 - Norwich University  
Men's College D2 - 
Men's College D3 - 
Women's College D1 - 
Women's College D2 - 
Women's College D3 -

2000
Men's Club D1 - 
Men's Club D2 -
Men's Club D3 - New England College All Black's

Women's Club D1 -
Women's Club D2 -
Women's Club D3 -
Men's College D1 -
Men's College D2 - 
Men's College D3 - 
Women's College D1 - 
Women's College D2 - 
Women's College D3 -

2001
Men's Club D1 - 
Men's Club D2 -
Men's Club D3 -
Women's Club D1 -
Women's Club D2 -
Women's Club D3 -
Men's College D1 -
Men's College D2 - 
Men's College D3 - Tufts University 
Men's College D4 - Bentley University 
Women's College D1 - 
Women's College D2 - 
Women's College D3 -

2002
Men's Club D1 - 
Men's Club D2 -
Men's Club D3 -
Women's Club D1 -
Women's Club D2 -
Women's Club D3 -
Men's College D1 -
Men's College D2 - 
Men's College D3 - 
Men's College D4 - Brandeis University
Women's College D1 - 
Women's College D2 - 
Women's College D3 -

2003
Men's Club D1 - Boston Irish Wolfhounds
Men's Club D2 -
Men's Club D3 -
Women's Club D1 -
Women's Club D2 -
Women's Club D3 -
Men's College D1 -
Men's College D2 - 
Men's College D3 - 
Men's College D4 - Wheaton College 
Women's College D1 - 
Women's College D2 - 
Women's College D3 -

2004
Men's Club D1 - Boston Irish Wolfhounds
Men's Club D2 -
Men's Club D3 -
Women's Club D1 -
Women's Club D2 -
Women's Club D3 -
Men's College D1 -
Men's College D2 - 
Men's College D3 - 
Men's College D4 - Maine Maritime Academy
Women's College D1 - 
Women's College D2 - 
Women's College D3 -

2005
Men's Club D1 - Boston Irish Wolfhounds
Men's Club D2 -
Men's Club D3 -
Women's Club D1 -
Women's Club D2 -
Women's Club D3 -
Men's College D1 -
Men's College D2 - 
Men's College D3 - Bentley University 
Men's College D4 - Saint Anselm College
Women's College D1 - 
Women's College D2 - 
Women's College D3 -

2006
Men's Club D1 - 
Men's Club D2 -
Men's Club D3 -
Women's Club D1 -
Women's Club D2 -
Women's Club D3 -
Men's College D1 -
Men's College D2 - United States Coast Guard Academy
Men's College D3 - Bentley University 
Men's College D4 - Nichols College 
Women's College D1 - 
Women's College D2 - 
Women's College D3 - 
Women's College D4 -

2007
Men's Club D1 - 
Men's Club D2
Men's Club D3
Women's Club D1
Women's Club D2
Women's Club D3
Men's College D1
Men's College D2 - Middlebury College
Men's College D3 - Plymouth State University
Men's College D4 - University of Massachusetts Dartmouth See: 2007 NERFU College Men's Division IV Rugby Tournament 
Women's College D1 - 
Women's College D2 - 
Women's College D3 - 
Women's College D4 -

2008
Men's Club D1 - Boston Irish Wolfhounds 
Men's Club D2
Men's Club D3
Women's Club D1
Women's Club D2
Women's Club D3
Men's College D1
Men's College D2 - Middlebury College
Men's College D3 - Salve Regina University See: 2008 NERFU College Men's Division III Rugby Tournament
Men's College D4 - Holy Cross College
Women's College D1 - United States Military Academy
Women's College D2 - Stonehill College
Women's College D3 - Bryant University
Women's College D4 - Holy Cross College

2009
Men's Club D1
Men's Club D2
Men's Club D3
Men's Club D4 - Saratoga Springs Stampede
Women's Club D1
Women's Club D2
Women's Club D3
Men's College D1
Men's College D2 - UMASS Amherst
Men's College D3 -
Men's College D4 - 
Women's College D1 -
Women's College D2 -
Women's College D3 -Massachusetts Institute of Technology
Women's College D4 -

2010
Men's Club D1
Men's Club D2
Men's Club D3 - Saratoga Springs Stampede
Men's Club D4
Women's Club D1
Women's Club D2
Women's Club D3
Men's College D1
Men's College D2 
Men's College D3 - Salve Regina University See 2010 NERFU College Men's Division III Rugby Tournament 
Men's College D4 - 
Women's College D1 -
Women's College D2 -
Women's College D3 - 
Women's College D4 -

2016
Men's Club D1
Men's Club D2
Men's Club D3
Men's Club D4
Women's Club D1
Women's Club D2
Women's Club D3
Men's College D1
Men's College D2
Men's College D3 - University of Maine at Orono 
Men's College D4
Women's College D1
Women's College D2
Women's College D3
Women's College D4 -

References

External links
 

Rugby union governing bodies in the United States
Rugby union in Massachusetts